Yorubaland is the homeland and cultural region of the Yoruba people in West Africa. It spans the modern-day countries of Nigeria, Togo and Benin, and covers a total land area of 142,114 km2 or about 60% of the land area of Ghana. Of this land area, 106,016 km2 (74.6%) lies within Nigeria, 18.9% in Benin, and the remaining 6.5% is in Togo. Prior to European colonization, a portion of this area was known as Yoruba country. The geo-cultural space contains an estimated 55 million people, the majority of this population being ethnic Yorubas.

Geography

 Geo-physically, Yorubaland spreads north from the Gulf of Guinea and west from the Niger River into Benin and Togo. In the northern section, Yorubaland begins in the suburbs just west of Lokoja and continues unbroken up to the Ogooué River tributary of the Mono River in Togo, a distance of around 610 km. In the south, it begins in an area just west of the Benin and Osse (Ovia) river occupied by the Ilaje Yorubas and continues uninterrupted up to Porto Novo, a total distance of about 280 km as the crow flies. West of Porto Novo Gbe speakers begin to predominate. The northern section is thus more expansive than the southern coastal section.

The land is characterised by mangrove forests, estuaries and coastal plains in the south, which rise steadily northwards into rolling hills and a jagged highland region in the interior, commonly known as the Yorubaland plateau or Western upland. The highlands are pronounced in the Ekiti area of the region, especially around the Effon ridge and the Okemesi fold belt, which have heights in excess of 732 m (2,400 ft) and are characterized by numerous waterfalls and springs such as Olumirin waterfall, Arinta waterfall, and Effon waterfall. The highest elevation is found at the Idanre Inselberg Hills, which have heights in excess of 1,050 meters. In general, the landscape of the interior is undulating land with occasional inselbergs jutting out dramatically from the surrounding rolling landscape. Some include: Okeagbe hills: 790m, Olosunta in Ikere Ekiti: 690m, Saki inselbergs, and Igbeti hill.

With coastal plains, southern lowlands, and interior highlands, Yorubaland has several large rivers and streams that crisscross the terrain. These rivers flow in two general directions within the Yoruba country; southwards into the lagoons, estuaries and creeks which empty into the Atlantic ocean, and northwards into the Niger river. Some southward flowing rivers include; The Osun and Shasha rivers which empty into the Lekki Lagoon, the Ogun River which empties into the Lagos Lagoon, the upper Mono River, Oba River, Erinle River, Yewa River which discharges into the Badagry creek, Okpara River which forms part of the Nigeria-Benin border and drains into the Porto-Novo lagoon, and the Ouémé River which drains into Lake Nokoué. On the eastern flank, the Owena (Siluko), Ofosu and Ose rivers empty into the Benin river creek. Those which flow in a northerly direction into the Niger include the Moshi river, Oshin, Awun, Ero and Oyi.

The Nigerian part of Yorubaland comprises today's Ọyọ, Ọṣun, Ogun, Kwara, Ondo, Ekiti, Lagos as well as parts of Kogi . The Beninese portion consists of Ouémé Department, Plateau Department, Collines Department, Tchaourou commune of Borgou Department, Bassila commune of Donga Department, Ouinhi and Zogbodomey commune of Zou Department, and Kandi commune of Alibori Department. The Togolese portions are the Ogou, Anié and Est-Mono prefectures in Plateaux Region, and the Tchamba prefecture in Centrale Region.

Vegetation and climate

The climate of Yorubaland varies from north to south. The southern, central and eastern portions of the territory is tropical high forest, known as the Nigerian lowland forests ecoregion. The characteristic vegetation is verdant closed-canopy forests composed of many varieties of hardwood trees including Milicia excelsa which is more commonly known locally as iroko, Antiaris africana, Terminalia superba which is known locally as afara, Entandrophragma or sapele, Lophira alata, Triplochiton scleroxylon (or obeche), Khaya grandifoliola (or African mahogany), Symphonia globulifera, and numerous other species. Some non-native species such as Tectona grandis (teak) and Gmelina arborea (pulp wood) have been introduced into the ecosystem and are being extensively grown in several large forest plantations.

The coastal section of this area features an area covered by swamp flats and dominated by such plants as mangroves and other stilt plants as well as palms, ferns and coconut trees on the beaches. This portion includes most of Ondo, Ekiti, Ogun, Osun, Lagos states and is characterised by generally high levels of precipitation defined by a double maxima (peak period); March–July and September–November. Annual rainfall in Ijebu Ode in the middle of Ogun state, for example, averages . The area is the center of thriving cocoa, natural rubber, kola nut and oil palm production industry, as well as lucrative logging. Ondo, Ekiti and Osun states are the leading producers of cocoa in Nigeria, while the southern portions of Ogun and Ondo states (Odigbo, Okitipupa and Irele) play host to large plantations of oil palm and rubber.

The northern and western portions of the region is characterized by tropical woodland savanna climate (Aw), with a single rainfall maxima. This area covers the northern two-thirds of Oyo, northwestern Ogun, Kwara, Kogi, Collines (Benin), northern half of Plateau department (Benin) and central Togo. It is part of the Guinean forest–savanna mosaic ecoregion, a transitional zone between West Africa's coastal forests and interior savannas. Part of this region is derived savanna which was once covered in forest but has lost tree cover due to agricultural and other pressures on land. Tree species here include the Blighia sapida more commonly known as ackee in English and ishin in Yoruba, and Parkia biglobosa which is the locust bean tree used in making iru or ogiri, a local cooking condiment.

The monsoon (rainy period) in both climatic zones is followed by a drier season characterized by northwest trade winds that bring the harmattan (cold dust-laden windstorms) that blow from the Sahara. They normally affect all areas except a small portion of the southern coast. Nonetheless, it has been reported that the harmattan has reached as far as Lagos in some years.

Major cities/towns

Administrative divisions

Prehistory and oral tradition

Settlement
Oduduwa is regarded as the legendary progenitor of the Yoruba, and almost every Yoruba settlement traces its origin to princes of Ile-Ife in Osun State, Nigeria. As such, Ife can be regarded as the cultural and spiritual homeland of the Yoruba nation, both within and outside Nigeria. According to an Oyo account, Oduduwa was a Yoruba emissary; said to have come from the east, sometimes understood by some sources as the "vicinity" true east on the cardinal points, but more likely signifying the region of the Ekiti and Okun sub-communities in Yorubaland, Nigeria.
On the other hand, linguistic evidence seems to corroborate the fact that the eastern half of Yorubaland was settled at an earlier time in history than the western regions, as the Northwest and Southwest Yoruba dialects show more linguistic innovations than their central and eastern counterparts.

Pre-Civil War
Between 1100 and 1700, the Yoruba Kingdom of Ife experienced a golden age, part of which was a sort of artistic and ideological renaissance. It was then surpassed by the Oyo Empire as the dominant Yoruba military and political power between 1700 and 1900. Yoruba people generally feel a deep sense of culture and tradition that unifies and helps identify them. There are sixteen established kingdoms, states that are said to have been descendants of Oduduwa himself. The other sub-kingdoms and chiefdoms that exist are second order branches of the original sixteen kingdoms.

There are various groups and subgroups in Yorubaland based on the many distinct dialects of the Yoruba language, which although all mutually intelligible, have peculiar differences. The governments of these diverse people are quite intricate and each group and subgroup varies in their pattern of governance. In general, government begins at home with the immediate family. The next level is the extended family with its own head, an Olori-Ebi. A collection of distantly related extended families makes up a town. The individual chiefs that serve the towns as corporate entities, called Olóyès, are subject to the Baálès that rule over them. A collection of distantly related towns makes up a clan. A separate group of Oloyes are subject to the Oba that rules over an individual clan, and this Oba may himself be subject to another Oba, depending on the grade of the Obaship.

History

Government
Ife was surpassed by the Oyo Empire as the dominant Yoruba military and political power between the year 1600 and 1800. The nearby kingdom of Benin was also a powerful force between 1300 and 1850.
Most of the city states were controlled by Obas, priestly monarchs, and councils made up of Oloyes, recognised leaders of royal, noble and, often, even common descent, who joined them in ruling over the kingdoms through a series of guilds and sects. Different states saw differing ratios of power between the kingship and the chiefs' council. Some, such as Oyo, had powerful, autocratic monarchs with almost total control, while in others such as the Ijebu city-states, the senatorial councils were supreme and the Ọba served as something of a figurehead. In all cases, however, Yoruba monarchs were subject to the continuing approval of their constituents as a matter of policy, and could be easily compelled to abdicate for demonstrating dictatorial tendencies or incompetence. The order to vacate the throne was usually communicated through an aroko or symbolic message, which usually took the form of parrot eggs delivered in a covered calabash bowl by the Basorun the head of Oyomesi (the lawmakers) after Judgements from the Ogbonis which were in the judiciary wing. In most cases, the message would compel the Oba to take his own life, which he was bound by oath to do.

Civil War
Following a jihad (known as the Fulani War) led by Uthman Dan Fodio (1754–1817) and a rapid consolidation of the Hausa city-states of contemporary northern Nigeria, the Fulani Sokoto Caliphate annexed the buffer Nupe Kingdom and began to press southwards towards the Oyo Empire. Shortly after, they overran the Yoruba city of Ilorin and then sacked Ọyọ-Ile, the capital city of the Oyo Empire. Further attempts by the Sokoto Caliphate to expand southwards were checked by the Yoruba who had rallied to resist under the military leadership of the city-state of Ibadan, which rose from the old Oyo Empire, and of the Ijebu city-states.

However, the Oyo hegemony had been dealt a mortal blow. The other Yoruba city-states broke free of Oyo dominance, and subsequently became embroiled in a series of internecine wars, a period when millions of individuals were forcibly transported to the Americas and the Caribbean, eventually ending up in such countries as the Bahamas, Cuba, the Dominican Republic, Puerto Rico, Brazil, Haiti and Venezuela, the United States, among others.

British colonization of Yorubaland

During the 19th century, the British Empire gradually colonized Yorubaland. In 1892, the British declared war on the Ijebu Kingdom in response to its barriers on trade. The British emerged victorious in the conflict and occupied the Ijebu capital. After British colonization, the capital served as an administrative center for colonial officials as the kingdom was annexed to the colony of Southern Nigeria. The colony was gradually expanded by protectorate treaties. These treaties proved decisive in the eventual annexation of the rest of Yorubaland and, eventually, of southern Nigeria and the Cameroons.

In 1960, greater Yorubaland was subsumed into the Federal Republic of Nigeria.

According to Yoruba historians, by the time the British came to colonize and subjugate Yorubaland first to itself and later to the Fulani of Northern Nigeria, the Yoruba were getting ready to recover from what is popularly known as the Yoruba Civil War. One of the lessons of the internecine Yoruba wars was the opening of Yorubaland to Fulani hegemony whose major interest was the imposition of sultanistic despotism on Old Oyo Ile and present-day Ilorin. The most visible consequence of this was the adding of almost one-fifth of Yorubaland from Offa to Old Oyo to Kabba to the then-Northern Nigeria of Lord Frederick Lugard and the subsequent subjugation of this portion of Yorubaland under the control of Fulani feudalism.

See also 
Yoruba country of precolonial West Africa

Notes

References

External links

Cultural regions
Geography of Benin
Geography of Nigeria
Geography of Togo
Yoruba history
Regions of West Africa